A Chance to Make History: What Works and What Doesn't in Providing an Excellent Education for All is a book by Wendy Kopp, CEO and Founder of Teach For America, that was published by PublicAffairs in January 2011.

In A Chance to Make History, Kopp draws on examples of effective teachers, schools, and districts to demonstrate what she believes is needed to provide all children with a "transformational" education.

A Chance to Make History is the second book by Wendy Kopp. Her first book, titled One Day, All Children: The Unlikely Triumph of Teach for America and What I Learned Along the Way, was published in 2003 by PublicAffairs.

Wendy Kopp

Wendy Kopp is the chair of the board and Founder of Teach For America, the national teaching corps. Kopp came up with the idea for the organization in her 1989 undergraduate research thesis at Princeton University. She is also the CEO and Co-Founder of Teach For All, a global network of independent nonprofit organizations that apply the same model as Teach For America in other countries.

Recognition

A Chance to Make History was named a Washington Post bestselling book in April 2011.

Footnotes

Books about education
2011 non-fiction books
English-language books
PublicAffairs books